CKCV-FM is a Canadian radio station broadcasting at 94.1 FM in Creston, British Columbia. The station plays a hot adult contemporary format branded as 94.1 Juice FM. The station is owned by Vista Radio.

The station received approval by the CRTC on August 9, 2013  
and officially launched on August 7, 2015 at 1:00 PM with studios located at 1230 Canyon Street in Creston.

This is the only station of the seven-stations "Juice FM" network to keep the "Greatest Hits" slogan, while the rest of the network now uses the "Biggest Variety" slogan.

References

External links
94.1 Juice FM
CKCV-FM history - Canadian Communication Foundation
Creston, BC - recnet.com

KCV
KCV
KCV
2015 establishments in British Columbia
Radio stations established in 2015